Parapodisma setouchiensis is a species of spur-throated grasshopper in the family Acrididae. It is found in Japan and South Korea.

References

External links

 

Melanoplinae
Insects described in 1979